The Una-Sana Canton (Serbian and  / Унско-сански кантон) is one of the ten cantons of the Federation of Bosnia and Herzegovina entity within Bosnia and Herzegovina. It is located in the northwest of the country and has been named after the rivers Una and Sana. The center of the cantonal government is Bihać. The canton is bordered by Republika Srpska from east, Canton 10 from southeast, and Croatia from south, west, and north.

Municipalities
It is divided into municipalities (usually eponymous with towns) of Bihać, Bosanska Krupa, Bosanski Petrovac, Bužim, Cazin, Ključ, Sanski Most and Velika Kladuša.

Political subdivisions

Demographics 

The liberalisation of the labour market in Germany in 2017 resulted in a large wave of emigration from Bosnia and Herzegovina. The Una-Sana Canton is the leader in terms of emigration. The Cantonal Ministry of Internal Affairs issued 15,900 certificates of impunity for the purpose of working abroad in 2021. For example, in 2017, the Ministry issued around 13,500 of such certificates, in 2018 around 14,800, in 2019 around 12,200 and in 2020, the number of such certificates issued was around 9,200. Also, in 2021, about 1,500 children enrolled in the first grades of elementary schools, 2,000 less than 20 years ago.

1991 

In the 1991 census, the canton of Una-Sana had 330,479 residents, including:

241,511 (73.08%) Muslims
67,351 (20.38%) Serbs
8,766 (2.653%) Croats
12,851 (3.887%) others

2013 Census

Traffic
Due to the proximity to Croatia and that country's narrow northern outline, various important traffic lines between Zagreb and the Adriatic traverse the Una-Sana canton, such as the railway line Bosanski Novi — Bihać — Knin. The largest airport of Željava is located near Bihać and is located right between Bosnian and Croatian border.

See also
 Political divisions of Bosnia and Herzegovina
 Bosanska Krajina
 List of heads of the Una-Sana Canton

Footnotes

References

External links

 
Cantons of the Federation of Bosnia and Herzegovina